Valérie Soudères (19 September 1914 – March 1995) née Briggs, also known in her early days as Valerie Hamilton, was a French pianist, composer, and pedagogue.

Biography 
Born in 1914, Soudères was the daughter of Georges-Hamilton Briggs, an English architect living in France. She entered the Conservatoire de Paris where she was a student of Maurice Emmanuel and won the First Prizes of the Conservatoire for piano, harmony, history of music, fugue and counterpoint, and accompaniment as well as a Second prize for musical composition.

She launched herself as a pianist by adopting the pseudonym of Valérie Hamilton. A refugee in London during World War II, she married François-Robert Soudères, originally from Béarn, and became Valérie Soudères.

Back in France, she teaches the piano and sight-reading at the Conservatoire de Paris with in particular, Isabelle Henriot and Bill Finegan as students. A renowned pianist, she performed, on 29 February 1948, Béla Bartók's Piano Concerto No. 3, on the occasion of its premiere in France, with the Pasdeloup Orchestra, at the salle Gaveau under the direction of Pierre Dervaux. She also took part to the premiere of Darius Milhaud's 4th Piano Concerto on 5 March 1952.

She organised events, such as the Honegger festival in 1953. In October 1954, she spoke in Paris at the first international congress devoted to the sociological aspects of music on radio.

This opera was premiered on 13 June 1958 by the orchestre de la RTF under the direction of Pierre Dervaux.

After having been a soloist for European radio stations, she became a "listening critic" for the Office de Radiodiffusion Télévision Française and was trained to electroacoustic music in Pierre Schaeffer's Groupe de Recherches Musicales.

In 1948, she was awarded the Suzanne Mesureur prize by the Société des auteurs, compositeurs et éditeurs de musique and made a chevalier of the Légion d'honneur in 1965.

Soudères died in 1995.

The  and Jean-Claude Pennetier, husband of her daughter France, interpret her Concerto béarnais en 2016.

Works (selection)

Compositions 
 Concerto béarnais for piano and orchestra, premiered in Paris in May 1947 by the Orchestre Lamoureux
 Que ma joie demeure, lyrical drama on a text by Jean Giono, libretto by François-Robert Soudères, premiered on the Radiodiffusion-Télévision Française on 13 June 1958 under the direction of Pierre Dervaux, with Nadine Sautereau, Ginette Guillamat, Camille Maurane, Xavier Depraz, Louis-Jacques Rondeleux and Louis Noguéra as interpreters.
 Stances et mouvement perpétuel for oboe and orchestra (circa 1951, Éditions Durand-Salabert-Eschig ME 6633) 
 Suite pour contrebasse et orchestre, six pièces pour contrebasse ou violoncelle et piano circa 1949, Éditions Costallat).
 Menuet-Fantaisie, for flute and piano (Durand, Amphion DA 1620)

Writings 
 Sens actuel de la pensée contrapuntic in Inventaire des techniques rédactionnelles, Polyphonie, revue musicale, cahiers 9–10, Paris, Richard-Masse 1954 .
 Les possibilités d'évolution rapide des jeunes compositeurs grâce à la radio, 1955.

Bibliography 
 Le guide du concert et du disque, n° 263–264, 11–27 March 1960: Valérie Soudères on the cover.

References

External links 
 Biographie de Valérie Soudères sur le site de l'OPPB

20th-century French women classical pianists
French women composers
1914 births
1995 deaths
Place of birth missing
Conservatoire de Paris alumni
Academic staff of the Conservatoire de Paris
Chevaliers of the Légion d'honneur
Women music educators